Pokaz is a surname. Notable people with the surname include:

 Igor Pokaz (born 1968), Croatian diplomat
 Ivan Pokaz (born 1942), Croatian general
 Tomislav Pokaz (born 1975), Croatian official

See also
 

Croatian surnames